César is an ancient red wine grape from northern Burgundy. It makes dark, tannic wines that are softened by blending with Pinot noir.

History
The name and the alternative of Romain refer to the tradition that César was brought to Burgundy by Roman legionaries. 

However DNA fingerprinting has shown that it is the result of a cross between Pinot noir and Argant.  Argant is a Spanish grape that was certainly grown in the Jura in the 19th century.

Distribution and Wines
Almost all César is found northwest of Dijon towards Chablis in the département of Yonne. It is best known in the red wines of Irancy, but may also be blended into rosé, clairet and Bourgogne mousseux.

Vine and Viticulture
César is an early budding variety, which makes it very vulnerable to frost in Burgundy. It is also fairly susceptible to mildew.

Synonyms
Céear, Céelar, Célar, Gros Monsieur, Gros noir, Picargneau, Picargniol, Picargniot, Picarniau, Picorneau, Romain, Romano, Ronçain, César noir,  Hureau, Lombard

Notes and references
This article is based in part on material from the German Wikipedia.

Further reading
 Robinson, Jancis Vines, Grapes & Wines Mitchell Beazley 1986

External links
 VIVC bibliography

Red wine grape varieties